Tanna is a 2015 Australian-Ni-Vanuatu film set on the island of Tanna in the South Pacific, depicting the true story of a couple who decided to marry for love, rather than obey their parents' wishes. Starring Marie Wawa and Mungau Dain, the film is based on an actual marriage dispute.

Tanna was the first film to be shot entirely on location in Vanuatu. The film won the Audience Award Pietro Barzisa at the 72nd Venice International Film Festival. It was selected as the Australian entry for the Best Foreign Language Film at the 89th Academy Awards, and was nominated for the award in January 2017.

Plot
On the island of Tanna, people following the Kastom have always enforced arranged marriages. The people of Kastom Road face sporadic conflicts with the Imedin tribe, while two followers of Kastom, Dain and Wawa, continue a secret love affair. Wawa's young sister Selin is impudent, stealing a penis sheath and running into the wilderness, berated for entering the forbidden zone where the Imedin once massacred their people. To teach Selin respect, her grandfather, who is also the tribe's shaman, takes her to the spiritual site of Yahul and the volcanoes. There, the Imedin attack the shaman, clubbing him, leaving him mortally wounded. Selin escapes and runs back to her people, who retrieve the shaman, while afraid his inevitable death will leave them vulnerable. The Imedin are summoned to the village to make peace. They trade pigs, which the shaman's murderers club to death just as they had the shaman, and Wawa is promised for marriage into the Imedin tribe.

Despite the arranged marriage, Wawa and Dain continue their affair. The elders learn of this, and plead to Wawa to give up the relationship. The elder women sympathize with Wawa for having to go through an arranged marriage, but tell her respect for her elders and the law will lead to happiness. Her peers also tell Wawa that she is not the only one whose interests are at stake. If the Imedin lose Wawa as a promised bride, they will likely seek revenge. Wawa reveals that she has already had sex with Dain, meaning she will be unacceptable to the Imedin anyway. Disgraced, Dain is exiled from the village. The elders continue to urge Wawa to accept her arranged marriage, pointing to Prince Philip to prove arranged marriage means love.

Wawa joins Dain in the wilderness, and hide on the side of the volcano, while their people and the Imedin both search for them. The two eat poison mushrooms. Their people bury them, and the elders agree recognition of love marriage must be added to the Kastom to keep their culture alive.

Production 
The film was shot entirely on location in and around the village of Yakel on Tanna Island. Co-director Bentley Dean lived with his family for seven months in Tanna. Most of the cast played their own roles in the film, and Dain was cast because he was considered the village's most handsome man. The film's dialogue is shot in the Southwest Tanna (Nivhaal dialect) and Nafe (Kwamera, South Tanna) languages, which are used in Yakel. The cast members did not regard the filming as being difficult because their roles were "performing what we were used to in our daily life." A copy of Ten Canoes was screened as an example for the actors.

This is Martin Butler and Dean’s third collaboration, after the documentaries Contact and First Footprints. Dean came to Vanuatu in 2003 to research a story on the John Frum movement for Dateline and wanted to return there to create something larger. Dean wanted to tell a local story and give his children a chance to live in the village, and developed the storyline in collaboration with the Yakel people.

Cast 
Marie Wawa as Wawa
Mungau Dain as Dain
Marceline Rofit as Selin
Charlie Kahla 	as Chief Charlie
Lingai Kowia as Father
Linette Yowayin as Mother
Albi Nangia as Grandfather and Shaman
Dadwa Mungau as Grandmother

Actor Mungau Dain died in January 2019, aged 24, due to sepsis following a leg injury. He was married and had three children.

Screening 
Just after Cyclone Pam, a special screening was held for the tribe.  The film has screened at the 72nd Venice International Film Festival, where it won the Audience Award Pietro Barzisa, and Bentley Dean was awarded Best Cinematographer, at the BFI London Film Festival, and at the 2015 Adelaide Film Festival.

Reception
Tanna has received critical acclaim. Tanna has an approval rating of 92% on review aggregator website Rotten Tomatoes, based on 39 reviews, and an average rating of 7.46/10. It has a score of 75% on Metacritic, based on 11 critics, indicating "generally favorable reviews". Kenneth Turan declared Tanna to be one of the best films about a South Pacific people. The Guardian critic Luke Buckmaster gave it four stars, and credited the novice actors as "magnetic" and praised the cinematography, saying, "Tanna has a warm, shimmering vitality. Like the trees and the birds, the frame feels alive". Varietys Richard Kuipers highlighted the aesthetics of the setting and shots, declaring "Visuals of lush forests, pristine beaches and barren black earth surrounding the volcano are beautiful without ever looking like a travelogue". In The Washington Post, Stephanie Merry wrote the story was uncomplicated but the setting was spectacular, remarking "There’s something thrilling about a movie that introduces us to a corner of the world we never knew existed". For The Globe and Mail, Brad Wheeler compared it to Romeo and Juliet and declared "Emotional notes are hit neatly and refreshingly".

Glenn Kenny wrote a negative review in The New York Times, concluding, "Despite its best efforts, Tanna drifts into a mode of exoticism that renders it an ultimately frustrating experience".

Accolades

Notes

See also 
Kastom
Love marriage
 List of submissions to the 89th Academy Awards for Best Foreign Language Film
 List of Australian submissions for the Academy Award for Best Foreign Language Film

References

External links 
 
 
 

2015 films
Vanuatuan films
Australian adventure drama films
2010s adventure drama films
Films with screenplays by John Collee
Films set in Vanuatu
2015 drama films
Arranged marriage